CH Gel Barcelona was an ice hockey team in Barcelona, Spain. They played in the Superliga Espanola de Hockey Hielo from 1979-1986.

History
The club was founded in 1979, and started playing in the Superliga Espanola de Hockey Hielo. After finishing eighth in their first two seasons, they were relegated to the Segunda Division, in which they came second, and were thus promoted for the 1982 season. They played the 1983 and 1984 seasons in the Superliga, and were then relegated again. They won the Segunda Division in 1985, and were promoted again to the Superliga. They folded after the 1986 season.

Results
1980 - 8th place
1981 - 8th place
1982 - 2nd place in Segunda Division
1983 - 5th place
1984 - 6th place
1985 - 1st place in Segunda Division
1986 - 4th place

External links
Spanish Ice Hockey Federation

Ice hockey teams in Catalonia
Sport in Barcelona
1979 establishments in Spain
1986 disestablishments in Spain
Defunct ice hockey teams in Europe